Events from the year 1958 in Michigan.

Top stories
The Associated Press ranked the top Michigan news stories of 1958 as follows:
 The November 18 sinking of the SS Carl D. Bradley in a Lake Michigan storm, resulting in the death of 33 of 35 crew members (AP-1, 350 points)
 The April 6 crash of Capital Airlines Flight 67 into Saginaw Bay on final approach to Freeland, Michigan, resulting in the deaths of all 47 persons on board (AP-2, 285 points)
 The Democratic Party's sweep of the November election (AP-3, 240 points))
 The case of Frank Kierdorf, business agent for Teamsters Local 332 in Flint, who was taken at gunpoint to a wooded area in Oakland County, set on fire, and then dropped off at St. Joseph Mercy Hospital in Pontiac (AP-4, 239 points)
 Dedication of the Mackinac Bridge (AP-5, 191 points)
 Negotiations and strikes between the UAW and Big Three automobile manufacturers (AP-6, 180 points)
 Proposal to create a state income tax (AP-7)
 Record unemployment (AP-8)
 Slump in the automobile industry (AP-9)
 1958 Detroit Tigers season, including the June 9 firing of manager Jack Tighe, the drop to fifth place, and the trade of Billy Martin to Cleveland (AP-10)

The United Press International ranked the state's top sports stories of 1958 as follows:
 The 1958 Michigan State Spartans football team, picked before the season to win the Big Ten championship, disappointed with a 3–5–1 record (0–5–1 Big Ten) (UPI-1)
 Pitcher Frank Lary, who came into the 1958 season with a 9-4 record against the New York Yankees, won seven games against the Yankees (UPI-2)
 The 1958 Michigan Wolverines football team's loss to Northwestern by a 55-24 score, the worst beating in program history (UPI-3)
 Pitcher Jim Bunning's July 20 no-hitter against the Boston Red Sox (UPI-4)
 The Detroit Tigers' June 9 firing of manager Jack Tighe (UPI-5)

Office holders

State office holders

 Governor of Michigan: G. Mennen Williams (Democrat)
 Lieutenant Governor of Michigan: Philip Hart (Democrat) 
 Michigan Attorney General: Paul Adams
 Michigan Secretary of State: James M. Hare (Democrat)
 Speaker of the Michigan House of Representatives: George Van Peursem (Republican)
 Majority Leader of the Michigan Senate: 
 Chief Justice, Michigan Supreme Court:

Mayors of major cities

 Mayor of Detroit: Louis Miriani
 Mayor of Grand Rapids: Paul G. Goebel/Stanley J. Davis
 Mayor of Flint: George M. Algoe/Robert J. Egan
 Mayor of Saginaw: R. James Harvey
 Mayor of Dearborn: Orville L. Hubbard
 Mayor of Lansing: Ralph Crego
 Mayor of Ann Arbor: Samuel J. Eldersveld

Federal office holders
 U.S. Senator from Michigan: Patrick V. McNamara (Democrat)
 U.S. Senator from Michigan: Charles E. Potter (Republican) 
 House District 1: Thaddeus M. Machrowicz (Democrat)
 House District 2: George Meader (Republican)
 House District 3: August E. Johansen (Republican)
 House District 4: Clare Hoffman (Republican)
 House District 5: Gerald Ford (Republican)
 House District 6: Charles E. Chamberlain (Republican)
 House District 7: Robert J. McIntosh (Republican)
 House District 8: Alvin Morell Bentley (Republican)
 House District 9: Robert P. Griffin (Republican)
 House District 10: Elford Albin Cederberg (Republican)
 House District 11: Victor A. Knox (Republican)
 House District 12: John B. Bennett (Republican)
 House District 13: Charles Diggs (Democrat)
 House District 14: Louis C. Rabaut (Democrat)
 House District 15: John Dingell Jr. (Democrat)
 House District 16: John Lesinski Jr. (Democrat)
 House District 17: Martha Griffiths (Democrat)
 House District 18: William Broomfield (Republican)

Population

Sports

Baseball
 1958 Detroit Tigers season – Under managers Jack Tighe and Bill Norman, the Tigers compiled a 77–77 record and finished in fifth place in the American League. The team's statistical leaders included Harvey Kuenn with a .319 batting average, Gail Harris with 20 home runs, Al Kaline with 85 RBIs, and Frank Lary with 16 wins and a 2.90 earned run average.
 1958 Michigan Wolverines baseball team - Under head coach Ray Fisher, the Wolverines compiled an 18–12 record.

American football
 1958 Detroit Lions season – The Lions, under head coach George Wilson, compiled a 4–7–1 record. The team's statistical leaders included Tobin Rote with 1,678 passing yards and 351 rushing yards, Dave Middleton with 506 receiving yards, and Jim Martin with 49 points scored.
 1958 Michigan State Spartans football team – Under head coach Duffy Daugherty, the Spartans compiled a 3–5–1 record. The team's statistical leaders included Mike Panitch with 250 passing yards, Dean Look with 328 rushing yards, and Sam Williams with 242 receiving yards. 
 1958 Michigan Wolverines football team – Under head coach Bennie Oosterbaan, the Wolverines compiled a 2-6-1 record. The team's statistical leaders included Bob Ptacek with 763 passing yards, Darrell Harper with 309 rushing yards and 54 points scored, and Gary Prahst with 313 receiving yards.
 1958 Eastern Michigan Hurons football team – Under head coach Fred Trosko, the Hurons compiled a 4–5 record.
 1958 Central Michigan Chippewas football team – Under head coach Kenneth "Bill" Kelly, the Chippewas compiled a 7–3 record. 
 1958 Western Michigan Broncos football team – Under head coach Merle Schlosser, the Broncos compiled a 4–5 record.
 1958 Detroit Titans football team – The Titans compiled a 4–4–1 record under head coach Wally Fromhart.

Basketball

 1957–58 Detroit Pistons season – In their first season in Detroit, under head coaches Charles Eckman and Red Rocha, the Pistons compiled a 33–39 record and finished in second place in the NBA's Western Division. The team's statistical leaders included George Yardley with 2,001 points, Walter Dukes with 954 rebounds, and Dick McGuire with 454 assists.
 1957–58 Michigan State Spartans men's basketball team – Under head coach Forddy Anderson, the Spartans compiled a 16–6 record. John Green led the team with an average of 18.0 points per game.
 1957–58 Michigan Wolverines men's basketball team – Under head coach William Perigo, the Wolverines compiled an 11–11 record. Pete Tillotson was the team's leading scorer with 415 points in 22 games for an average of 18.8 points per game.
 1957–58 Western Michigan Broncos men's basketball team – Under head coach Joseph Hoy, the Broncos compiled a 5–19 record.
 1957–58 Detroit Titans men's basketball team – The Titans compiled a 13–12 record under head coach Bob Calihan.

Ice hockey
 1957–58 Detroit Red Wings season – Under head coaches Jimmy Skinner and Sid Abel, the Red Wings compiled a 29–29–12 record, finished in third place in the National Hockey League, and lost to the Montreal Canadiens in the first round of the playoffs. Gordie Howe led the team with 33 goals, 44 assists, and 77 points. The team's goaltender was Terry Sawchuk. 
 1957–58 Michigan Wolverines men's ice hockey season – Under head coach Al Renfrew, the Wolverines compiled an 8–13 record. 
 1957–58 Michigan Tech Huskies men's ice hockey team – Under head coach John MacInnes, Michigan Tech compiled an 11–16–1 record.
 1957–58 Michigan State Spartans men's ice hockey team – Under head coach Amo Bessone, the Spartans compiled a 12–11 record.

Boat racing
 Port Huron to Mackinac Boat Race – 
 APBA Gold Cup –

Golf
 Michigan Open – 
 Motor City Open -

Chronology of events

January

February

March

April

May

June

July

August

September

October

November

December

Births
 January 8 - Betsy DeVos, businesswoman and current Secretary of Education, in Holland, Michigan
 March 10 - Steve Howe, Major League Baseball pitcher (1980–1996), in Pontiac, Michigan
 March 31 - Danny Bass, Canadian Football League player (1980-1991), in Lansing, Michigan
 June 22 - Bruce Campbell, actor (Evil Dead franchise, The Adventures of Brisco County, Jr., Burn Notice), in Royal Oak, Michigan
 July 15 - Mike Duggan, Mayor of Detroit since 2014, in Detroit
 August 11 - Dan Kildee, U.S. Congressman since 2013, in Flint, Michigan
 August 16 - Madonna, singer and entertainer, in Bay City, Michigan
 August 19 - Rick Snyder, Governor of Michigan (2011–2019), in Battle Creek, Michigan
 August 21 - Gary Hogeboom, NFL quarterback (1980–1990), in Grand Rapids, Michigan
 October 23 - Michael Eric Dyson, sociology professor, author, and radio host, in Detroit
 December 1 - Gary Peters, U.S. Congress (2009-2015), U.S. Senate (2015-present), in Pontiac, Michigan
 December 24 - Gene Sperling, economist who was Director of the National Economic Council and Assistant to the President for Economic Policy under Presidents Bill Clinton and Barack Obama, in Ann Arbor, Michigan

Gallery of 1958 births

Deaths
 October 25 - Edward Aloysius Mooney, Roman Catholic Cardinal and Archbishop of Detroit (1937-1958), at age 76 in Rome, Italy
 November - H. G. Salsinger, sports editor of The Detroit News for 49 years, at age 73 in Detroit

Gallery of 1958 deaths

See also
 History of Michigan
 History of Detroit

References